Panchiko is a British indie rock band originating from Nottingham, England. Formed sometime between 1997 and 1998, it originally consisted of lead vocalist and guitarist Owain Davies, guitarist and keyboardist Andrew "Andy" Wright, bassist Shaun Ferreday, and a drummer named John. A year after the revival of Panchiko in 2020, the band was joined by two new members, guitarist Robert "Rob" Harris and John Schofield (replacing the original John on drums).

The band first received public attention in 2016 when their 2000 demo EP D>E>A>T>H>M>E>T>A>L was discovered by a 4chan user in a charity shop in Sherwood, Nottingham and shared online. The EP's status as lost media led to a dedicated cult following and a community devoted to tracking down its band members. This was unbeknownst to the band until 2020, when Davies was found and contacted by a fan through Facebook.

Panchiko has since released two compilation albums remastering their older music, a reissue of D>E>A>T>H>M>E>T>A>L combining their two EPs and Ferric Oxide (Demos 1997-2001). In December 2021, the band performed their first show in over twenty years in their hometown of Nottingham, after which they embarked on their first tour in the United States. In November 2021, they amassed over 10 million streams on Spotify. As of 2023, they have over 600,000 monthly listeners.

The band's debut album Failed at Math(s) is slated for May 5, 2023, followed by their second full tour in the United States.

1997-2001: Formation, D>E>A>T>H>M>E>T>A>L, and disbanding
Panchiko was founded sometime between 1997 and 1998 when its members were 16–17 years old and nearing the end of secondary school. The band consisted of childhood friends from Nottingham—Owain Davies, Andy Wright, Shaun Ferreday, and John (his surname has never been disclosed). Panchiko's band name is derived from a misspelling of "Pachinko," a mechanical game originating in Japan. Davies has stated that otaku culture had an influence on the band's image, describing himself to be a fan of anime soundtracks, JRPGs, Final Fantasy, and Studio Ghibli. The music they made was primarily influenced by Radiohead, Super Furry Animals, and Ultrasound; and other bands like Air, The Beatles, DJ Shadow, Joy Division, New Order, and Nirvana; as well as A Grand Love Story by Kid Loco.

The band initially performed live covers in local pubs despite being underage. They also performed in Battle of the Bands competitions, but never won and rarely received positive feedback. On many occasions, the band would spend weekends at John's home in rural Lincolnshire, practicing in the family's converted cellar. 

After an unsuccessful visit to a studio, Panchiko eventually began to produce music in their basements and bedrooms using cheap equipment. Davies has stated that their first extended play, D>E>A>T>H>M>E>T>A>L, was recorded between 1999 and 2000, with Wright serving as the group's producer. Much of it was recorded in Wright's bedroom using a TASCAM digital recorder and Roland Virtual Studio. A DJX keyboard vibraphone was utilized for sampling. It was completed on June 18, 2000.

The cover artwork for D>E>A>T>H>M>E>T>A>L has since become the band's defining iconography. It was taken from a panel of Mint na Bokura, a Japanese manga series by Wataru Yoshizumi spanning from 1997 to 1999. The original image can be found in chapter 13 on page 28. It depicts the character Miyu Makimura telling Ryuuji Sasa to "be careful" after he accidentally steps on her foot. When asked about the cover art, Wright elaborated that he "found a nice picture on the internet and then stuck some words on it." A different character drawn in the style of anime can be found on the back of the EP, however, Davies and Wright are unsure of the image's origin. Notably, the EP's liner notes only credit the band members by their first names: Owain, Andy, Shaun, and John.

The title track, "D>E>A>T>H>M>E>T>A>L," samples the opening theme for Dr. Strangelove, "Theme From the Planets" by Dexter Wansel, and the Sega Saturn CD warning from the video game Burning Rangers, and it makes reference of Roy Fokker from the anime Super Dimension Fortress Macross. The next track, "Stabilisers for Big Boys," incorporates elements from "Fame Thing" by Ultrasound and was named after a line from Scrapheap Challenge. The third track, "Laputa," is inspired by the Studio Ghibli anime Castle in the Sky. The final track, "The Eyes of Ibad," references science fiction novel Dune. The music on the EP has been described as emo, industrial, dream pop, psychedelic, shoegaze, trip hop, and vaporwave.

Roughly 30 self-produced copies were burned on CD-R and shared among friends, with a few copies being sent to reviewers and labels. Aside from some "not very positive" reviews, Panchiko only received one response from a label they had sent their EP to, London-based record label Fierce Panda. Label owner Simon Williams made the following note in his demo logs documenting his impressions of the EP:

Despite Fierce Panda showing some interest, the band ultimately remained unsigned. Davies stated that they did not have the means to perform in London at the time, and speculated that "no A&R would travel to Nottingham to see one band."

Between 2000 and 2001, Panchiko recorded three more songs for an EP called Kicking Cars, which would go unreleased. In 2001, the band members were in sixth form and college. Ferreday said that he was balancing college, studying classical guitar, and working different part-time jobs. "I'd meet Owain and Andy in the evenings and discover most of a song had been written," he explained, "and I just had to add in a bassline." Davies recalls that acquiring a Yamaha sampler and Korg MS2000 allowed for the band to remix drums and experiment with analog synths for Kicking Cars. The song "Cut" samples "Song of the Seashell (Sakuragai No Uta)" by Sir James Galway, and the song "Sodium Chloride" references Blade Runner. Davies revealed that John helped him write "Kicking Cars," the EP's titular track. Their second EP has been described as "art rock".

Wright remembers performing at a small festival in Sutton-in-Ashfield in mid-2001, "playing to people milling about, buying a hotdog, and staring at you weirdly." Panchiko disbanded shortly after the festival. Davies recalls that this decision was not entirely conscious because he, Wright, and Ferreday were already enrolled in college, while John was enlisted into the military.

After disbanding
In between the time of D>E>A>T>H>M>E>T>A>L and the band's resurgence, Wright was the only original member to remain involved in music. After college, he performed with the Nottingham-based art rock band Swimming, appearing on their EP Pacifictitle (2006) and their album The Fireflow Trade (2009). He also released Doom Wop EP in 2011 as a member of Nottingham indie studio project Alana. Afterward, he began his own folk-pop musical project called We Show Up on RadaR. The following three full-length albums have been released so far: Sadness Defeated (2012), WSUOR (2016), and Zanzibar Whip Coral (2019). His third album features future Panchiko collaborators Hugh Pascall and John Schofield. On occasion, he worked alongside Swimming guitarist Joff Spittlehouse as a co-producer. In 2019, he grew involved with the band Tongg, assisting in production of their EP Brains Out (2020) and their album Karate in the Dark (2021). Wright has mixed, mastered, and produced for the aforementioned groups and other bands as a professional sound engineer.

Davies briefly produced electronic music under the name TheMIDSR and served as a video jockey at live events in the gaming industry, but he eventually pursued a career in the field of education. Ferreday sold his guitars and had not played music until Panchiko's future reunion. He has since married and has children; he now works as a tree surgeon. The original drummer John was enlisted into the military soon after Panchiko disbanded. Afterward, the other three members lost touch with him completely.

2016-2020: Resurgence and search effort

On July 21, 2016, a copy of Panchiko's EP D>E>A>T>H>M>E>T>A>L was discovered in an Oxfam charity shop in Nottingham by a user of the online message board 4chan. The user shared an image of the CD on the music board /mu/ and requested assistance in uncovering more information about the band. The liner notes contained only the band members' first names and the EP's year of release,  making further investigation difficult. The tracks on the EP were eventually ripped and shared online via download links on Mega and Zippyshare, but due to the age and deterioration of the CD-R, disc rot had corrupted and heavily distorted the audio.

In 2017, D>E>A>T>H>M>E>T>A>L was further popularized when a full rip of the EP was uploaded to YouTube by a user called "sticki," a 19-year-old from the San Francisco Bay area who had 10,000 subscribers at the time. Many maintained D>E>A>T>H>M>E>T>A>L to be a hoax, speculating that the initial 4chan post was a publicity stunt, but the band had nonetheless gained a significant cult following without their knowledge. Despite generating considerable interest, no information was uncovered regarding the band.

On August 5, 2019, sticki re-uploaded D>E>A>T>H>M>E>T>A>L to a new YouTube channel in an effort to catalog obscure music. The channel, called "dismiss yourself," sparked renewed interest in Panchiko and catalyzed the formation of a dedicated search effort on Reddit and Discord. In mid-September 2019, a designated Discord channel called "Panchikord" was established by an Argentinian user called "Zod," and it served as a platform and central hub for the community to gather, compile, and discuss their research into the mysteries surrounding Panchiko. Participants of the channel continued investigating, and on January 19, 2020, one individual took note of the bar code on the EP's cover. Googling "Oxfam" and the last four digits on the sticker directed them to an Oxfam shop in Sherwood, Nottingham, leading users to search for musicians in the area named "Owain."

On January 21, 2020, a Discord user called "Granlar" successfully located the now defunct Facebook profile belonging to Panchiko's lead singer and messaged them, "Hello, you’ll probably never read this, but are you the lead singer of Panchiko?" to which Davies replied, "Yeah." Davies, now in his late 30s, had been completely unaware of D>E>A>T>H>M>E>T>A>L>s circulation on the internet. He immediately contacted Wright, who was in South Korea; Wright then contacted Ferreday, who was in Cambridge. Neither of them were aware of the band's newfound popularity either. Overall, the search effort spanned from July 21, 2016, to January 21, 2020, lasting a total of 1,279 days.

The original drummer John was no longer in contact with the band, and his whereabouts are currently unknown. It is also unclear if he is aware of Panchiko's current status or success.

2020-present: Reformation, reissues, and touring
Wright, after being contacted by Davies, tasked himself with recovering and remastering Panchiko's past works. During Wright's restoration efforts, Davies is quoted saying the following:

Wright initially struggled to restore the audio, explaining that "a Roland VS-840 was used for the multi-tracking with a computer synched but only used to sequence samples from the hardware Akai S2000 sampler" and that the original masters had since become lost. However, a friend of Wright's in possession of the original EP reached out, their copy in significantly better condition and without the disc rot. Using this copy, Wright managed to remaster D>E>A>T>H>M>E>T>A>L'''s four tracks. They were subsequently released two weeks later, offering listeners clearer versions for the first time.

On February 16, 2020, Panchiko reissued D>E>A>T>H>M>E>T>A>L through Bandcamp, expanding it into a full-length compilation album. It retains the original cover art from the EP but with slight alterations to the design. The reissue also includes tracks from their unreleased EP Kicking Cars from 2001, as well as the original "rotted" versions of D>E>A>T>H>M>E>T>A>Ls four tracks. It became one of the best-selling albums on Bandcamp on the day it was released. Additionally, Wright permitted the owner of "dismiss yourself" to distribute the release on their YouTube channel, expanding the band's audience even further." This new upload current has over 380,000 views. The compilation album was released on Spotify two months later.

From there, Davies, Wright, and Ferreday worked together to revamp their band, albeit without their original drummer John, who could not be tracked down. Throughout 2020 and 2021, Panchiko issued more unreleased music recorded between 1997 and 2001, as well as new original music. This music was released to streaming services and sold in a variety of physical formats through Bandcamp, including vinyls and cassettes. In July 2020, Panchiko released Ferric Oxide (Demos 1997-2001), which contains 18 previously unreleased demo tracks. In May 2020, they released "R>O>B>O>T>S>R>E>P>R>I>S>E," a rerecording of their song "Laputa". In June 2020, they released "Machine Gun Drum," their first original song since disbanding. In February 2021, the band released The Death Of, which contains "Infinite Pieces," a track they had stumbled upon by accident after discovering a CD with no label. This was the final track the band recorded before disbanding in 2001.

In November 2020, Panchiko released a collection of remixes of their song "D>E>A>T>H>M>E>T>A>L." For this project, Panchiko collaborated with artists including CJ Mirra, Identity Clinic, and Tongg. In the past, Wright had regularly contributed keys and produced for Tongg under the name We Show Up on RadaR. Among other members, Tongg consists of members Rob Harris (who performs vocals, guitar, and keys) and John Schofield (who performs drums and percussion). Trumpeter Hugh Pascall, a frequent Tongg collaborator, co-produced another of the "D>E>A>T>H>M>E>T>A>L" remixes alongside Wright.

In late 2021, Panchiko recruited Harris and Schofield as guitarist and drummer, respectively. On August 31, 2021, the band reconvened for their first practice session in 20 years. On December 6, 2021, they performed their first live show since disbanding at the Metronome venue in their hometown of Nottingham, playing in front of a crowd of over 400 attendees.

On May 13, 2022, they performed their next major gig in Hackney, London alongside alt-indie act Lindsay Munroe. Later that year, the band embarked on their first tour, set in the United States and including a performance at the South by Southwest festival in Texas. During their tour, they released a deluxe pressing called D>E>L>U>X>E>M>E>T>A>L, which rose to the number two spot on Bandcamp's alternative chart on October 20.

On February 13, 2023, the band announced the release of their debut album Failed at Math(s)'', slated for May 5 of the same year. On March 7, 2023, Panchiko released "Failed at Math(s)," the titular track from their upcoming album. It is the second original song to be released that was recorded after their reformation. In May 2023, Panchiko will embark on their second full tour in the United States.

Band members
On many of their releases, the band members are credited with "Panchiko" as a surname, i.e. "Andy Panchiko."

Current members
 Owain Davies – vocals, guitar, sampling, production, lyrics , piano, artwork 
 Andrew "Andy" Wright – guitar, keyboard, sampling, sequencing, engineering, production, lyrics , artwork 
 Shaun Ferreday – bass, bass programming, effects 
 Robert "Rob" Harris – guitar 
 John Schofield – drums, percussion 

Past members
 John – drums, sequencing

Discography

Albums

Studio albums

Compilation albums

Extended plays

Remix projects

Live releases

Singles

Tours

Notes

References

External links
 Panchiko on Bandcamp

British alternative rock groups
British shoegaze musical groups
British indie rock groups
Musical groups from Nottingham
1998 establishments in the United Kingdom